Tabenna (also Tabennae, Tabennisi) is considered the first cenobitic monastery.  It was a community founded during the 4th century by Saint Pachomius the Great in the modern hamlet of Al Rahmaniya Qebli (formerly Al Dabbah) near Chenoboskion which is about 5 km east of Nag Hammadi in Upper Egypt.

References

Populated places in Egypt
Coptic settlements